Las Catalinas Mall is an enclosed shopping mall located in Caguas, Puerto Rico. The mall opened in 1997, and is currently anchored by two vacant anchor stores that were previously Kmart and Sears. A former anchor tenant, Sears, closed their store in February 2021. The store itself sits vacant as of December 2021.  The mall is home to the first "Large Premium Format" movie theater in Puerto Rico and second in the Caribbean region at the time of its opening, which is owned and managed by Caribbean Cinemas.

History
During the 19th century, Las Catalinas Mall’s grounds used to be a sugar producer farm called Hacienda Santa Catalina. Besides from sugar, the Hacienda Santa Catalina also produced rum and cultivated fruits.

During construction, the mall was originally named the "Caguas Centrum" shopping center. Las Catalinas Mall opened on December 4th, 1997 with 80 stores and 3,000 spaces of parking. The mall was built with the purpose to serve the surrounding communities, but it grew to become a regional mall. The shopping center is currently owned by Urban Edge Properties, which also owns the Montehiedra Town Center in south San Juan, Puerto Rico.

On November 4th, 1998 Vornado Realty Trust bought Kmart's 50% interest in the mall forming a joined ownership between Vornado and Yebba Realty Ventures. In addition, Vornado acquired 75% and Yebba Realty Ventures acquired 25% of Kmart's anchor store. Vornado's purchase price in total was $38 million dollars.

On September 23rd, 2002 Vornado Realty Trust increased its interest in Las Catalinas to 100% by acquiring the other 50% of the mall from Yebba Realty Ventures and the 25% from the Kmart anchor store. The purchase price was approximately $48 million dollars.

In 2015, Vornado Realty Trust announced it would spin off multiple of its properties into a new company Urban Edge Properties which included Las Catalinas, this made Urban Edge the shopping centers new owner. 

In 2015, Sears Holdings spun off 235 of its properties, including the Sears at Las Catalinas Mall, into Seritage Growth Properties.

On November 8, 2018, Sears Holdings announced that Kmart would be closing as part of a plan to close 40 stores nationwide. The store closed on January 31, 2019.

On December 28, 2020, it was announced that Sears would also be closing in February 2021 as part of a plan to close 23 stores nationwide which temporarily left the mall with no anchors left.

By Summer 2021, a Coast Guard Exchange store opened in the former Office Depot.

In August 2021, it was announced that a Sector Sixty6 Entertainment Center and a Golden Corral would replace the former Kmart store. They were expected to open by 2022, but never happened for unknown reasons.

Current Anchors                              
Two vacant anchor tenants

Outparcels
Home Depot
Caribbean Cinemas
Supermercados Amigo
Burlington Coat Factory
Coast Guard Exchange

Former Anchors
Kmart
Sears

Former Outparcels
Office Depot 
Best Buy 
Walgreens

References

Caguas, Puerto Rico
Shopping malls in Puerto Rico
Shopping malls established in 1997
Economic history of Puerto Rico